William Henry Ewing (March 22, 1841 – September 2, 1924) was an American Democratic politician who represented Prince Edward County in the Virginia House of Delegates from 1910 to 1914.

References

External links
 
 

1841 births
1924 deaths
Democratic Party members of the Virginia House of Delegates
People from Prince Edward County, Virginia
20th-century American politicians